Garry Owen (February 18, 1902 – June 1, 1951) was an American actor, best known for his role as the taxi driver in Arsenic and Old Lace. He appeared in more than 185 films between 1933 and 1952.

Owen was born in Brookhaven, Mississippi, on February 18, 1902. He died in Hollywood, California, on June 1, 1951.

Filmography

References

External links

1902 births
1951 deaths
20th-century American male actors
American male film actors
American male stage actors
People from Brookhaven, Mississippi